Fockea multiflora, or python vine/creeper, is a large succulent liane, growing to some 15m in length and up to 60 cm in diameter, and found in Kenya, Tanzania, Malawi, Zambia, Zimbabwe, Mozambique, Botswana, Namibia and Angola. Fockea comprises 6 species, all occurring south of the equator in Africa.

This species has a swollen tuberous base (caudex) with branches either sprawling on the ground or twining up any available support, the caudex varying greatly in shape and holding copious amounts of poisonous, milky sap. Leaves are large (100mm x 80mm), broadly elliptic, opposite, with undersides distinctively white-felted. These leaves, as well as the fruits and seeds, are much larger than other Fockea species.

Flowering may take place in the absence of any leaves. Unusually large numbers of 15mm diameter, yellow-green flowers are borne on young growth. Flowers are bisexual and regular, 5-merous, fragrant; the hispid pedicel is 5–13mm long; sepals are lanceolate, some 2.5mm long, and hispid on the outer surface; the corolla tube is campanulate, 15–25mm long, lobes oblong with margins and apex slightly revolute; corona is white and glabrous; ovary superior. The fruits are smooth, paired and horn-shaped, 10–22 cm × 1.5–3 cm, dehiscing to release multiple winged seeds; seeds are ovate and flattened, 10 mm × 7–8 mm, shortly winged.

Growing in the altitude range of 500–1200 metres, it is widespread and frequently found in rocky places on or at the foot of low hills, in Mopane or Brachystegia woodland, or on river banks. This species is cultivated and traded as an ornamental by succulent enthusiasts.

References

External links
A Systematic Study of the Old World Genus Fockea

multiflora
Flora of Africa